The Al-Qādisiyyah governorate election of 2013 was held on 20 April 2013 alongside elections for all other governorates outside Iraqi Kurdistan, Kirkuk, Anbar, and Nineveh.

Results 

|- style="background-color:#E9E9E9"
!align="left" colspan=2 valign=top|Party/Coalition!! Allied national parties !! Leader !!Seats !! Change !!Votes
|-
|bgcolor="#FF0000"|
|align=left|State of Law Coalition || ||Nouri Al-Maliki|| 8 || || 114,697
|-
|bgcolor="#009933"|
|align=left|Citizens Alliance ||align=left| || Ammar al-Hakim || 5 || || 66,691
|-
|bgcolor="#000000"|
|align=left|Liberal Coalition|| ||Muqtada al-Sadr|| 4 || - || 50,544
|-
|
|align=left|Al Diwaniyah People's Independent Coalition || || Jaafar Mussa Zaalan Hachem || 4 || || 49,831
|-
|bgcolor="#6398FE"|
|align=left|National White Bloc || align=left| || align=left| || 2 || || 33,092
|-
|bgcolor="#286F42"|
|align=left|Islamic Dawa Party - Iraq Organization || || || 2 || || 29,517
|-
|
|align=left|Loyalty to Iraq Coalition || || || 1 || || 11,207
|-
|
|align=left|Al Diwaniyah's Civil Alliance || || || 1 || || 9,472
|-
|
|align=left|Equitable State Movement || || || 1 || || 8,141
|-
|
|align=left|New Dawn Bloc || || || || || 3,558
|-
|bgcolor="#098DCD"|
|align=left|Al Iraqia National and United Coalition || || align=left|Ayad Allawi || || || 3,311
|-
|bgcolor="#F6BE22"|
|align=left|Iraq's Benevolence and Generosity List || || || || || 2,217
|-
|
|align=left|Islamic Advocates’ Party || || || || || 1,979
|-
|
|align=left|Al Diwaniyah's Will Coalition || || || || || 1,829
|-
|colspan=2 align=left| Total || || || 28 || || 386,086
|-
|colspan=7 align=left|Sources: al-Sumaria - Al-Qādisiyyah Coalitions, ISW, IHEC

References 

2013 Iraqi governorate elections